The Heinz Awards are individual achievement honors given annually by the Heinz Family Foundation. The Heinz Awards each year recognize outstanding individuals for their innovative contributions in three areas: the Arts, the Economy and the Environment. The award was established in 1993 by Teresa Heinz, the chairwoman of the Heinz Family Foundation, in honor of her late husband, U.S. Senator H. John Heinz III. The Heinz Award is considered to be among the largest individual achievement prizes in the world.

Two recipients in each of the three categories receive an unrestricted prize of 250,000 and a cast silver medallion. In 2009 through 2011, the Awards instead did a Special Focus on the Environment, and widened the awards to 10 people, each winner receiving 100,000 and a medallion. The Heinz Award medallion displays the likeness of Senator Heinz and the words "Shared Ideals Realized" on its front side, which is a quote from the late Senator Heinz. On the medallion's reverse side the image of a globe being exchanged between two hands is displayed.

Selection process

Criteria
As written by the Heinz Family Foundation, the candidates who are chosen must meet three standards:

First, nominees must exhibit the following personal characteristics: A passion for excellence that goes beyond intellectual curiosity; a concern for humanity rooted in a deep sensitivity for the well-being of others; and a broad vision which extends far beyond the particular and embraces something universal.

Second, work of the candidates for a Heinz Award must meet the following criteria: Be significant and not a "quick fix"; Have an enduring and meaningful impact; be creative and innovative; and be sufficiently tangible to serve as a model for replication elsewhere.

Third, candidates should be actively working in the field in which they are nominated so that this award will enhance their potential for future societal contribution.

Selection
Members of an anonymous Council of Nominators are chosen for their expertise in the fields relevant to the award for which they will be nominating. After the nominators have chosen the candidates, the nominations are forwarded to a jury consisting of noted experts in each of the five categories. The jury then chooses the final recipients and sends these to the program's Board for final approval.

The Chairman's Medal
In certain years, the Heinz Awards Board has also chosen to honor the lifetime achievement of a particular individual. The award is a non-monetary prize, and the honoree is presented with the Awards' medallion at the same ceremony as the other laureates.

Special Focus on the Environment
In 2009, in honor of the awards' 15th anniversary, an award for special focus on the environment was created in lieu of the traditional five awards. A larger group of 10 individuals were awarded 100,000 each, honoring those working in innovative ways to address the environment through the lens of the existing five categories.

Similarly, in 2010 and 2011 the Special Focus was continued, and in both years 10 individuals were again each awarded 100,000 each. In 2012, the Awards returned to the core five categories.

Recipients

See also

 List of awards for contributions to culture
 List of awards for contributions to society
 List of environmental awards

References

External links
 HeinzAwards.org

Awards established in 1993
Awards for contributions to culture
Environmental awards
Awards for contributions to society